Moroa (also spelt Moro'a and Marwa; Tyap: Sholyia̱) is a Chiefdom of the Asholyio people and a village in Kaura Local Government Area of southern Kaduna state in the Middle Belt region of Nigeria.

References

Populated places in Kaduna State